The 1902 Atlantic hurricane season featured five known tropical cyclones, three of which made landfall in the United States. The first system was initially observed in the northwestern Caribbean on June 12. The last system dissipated on November 6 while located well southeast of Newfoundland. These dates fall within the period with the most tropical cyclone activity in the Atlantic. None of the systems existed simultaneously.

Of the season's five tropical cyclones, three reached hurricane status. However, none of them strengthened into major hurricanes, which are Category 3 or higher on the modern-day Saffir–Simpson hurricane wind scale. Along with 1901, this was the first time that two consecutive seasons lacked a major hurricane since 1864 and 1865. Only one storm left significant impact, which was the second hurricane. It brought flooding and strong winds to Texas, resulting in severe damage in some areas. A tornado spawned by the storm also caused five fatalities.

The season's activity was reflected with an accumulated cyclone energy (ACE) rating of 28, the lowest value since 1890. ACE is a metric used to express the energy used by a tropical cyclone during its lifetime. Therefore, a storm with a longer duration will have high values of ACE. It is only calculated at six-hour increments in which specific tropical and subtropical systems are either at or above sustained wind speeds of 39 mph (63 km/h), which is the threshold for tropical storm intensity. Thus, tropical depressions are not included here.


Timeline

Systems

Tropical Storm One 

In June, a low-pressure area was observed over the western Caribbean. The depression moved north-northeastward and intensified into a tropical storm early the next day. Around 23:00 UTC, it made landfall near Steinhatchee, Florida, at the same intensity.

After moving inland, the storm moved northeastward and slowly weakened. Around midday on June 16, the system became extratropical over southeastern Virginia and then accelerated northeastward, before dissipating near Anticosti Island, Quebec, late on the following day. Some locations in Florida observed tropical storm force winds. A drought in the area was ended, which particularly benefited tobacco crops.

Hurricane Two 

The second observed tropical cyclone of the season developed over Chiapas at 00:00 UTC on June 21. Initially a tropical depression, the system moved slowly northwestward and reached the Gulf of Mexico early the next day. Around 12:00 UTC on June 23, it strengthened into a tropical storm. While curving north-northwestward, the storm intensified into a hurricane at 00:00 UTC on June 26. However, it then began to weaken falling to tropical storm status late on June 26. After moving inland, the system quickly weakened and became extratropical over Oklahoma by midday on June 28. The remnants moved rapidly northeastward before dissipating over Pennsylvania the next day.

A drought existed in Texas for the previous six weeks. Thus, rainfall produce by this storm was beneficial to cotton and rice. However, withered corn stalks were easily blown down by the wind. Further, heavy precipitation in some areas resulted in flooding. This swelled Lanana and Bonita creeks. All bridges were swept away and communication was cut off, while the south side of town was underwater. At Galveston,  of rain fell on June 27, setting a daily rainfall record. Morgan's Point was  under water. In Gregg and Harrison counties, heavy rains washed out the Texas and Pacific railroads. Flooding occurred across the upper Sabine basin as well.

A freight train was blown off the track at East Bernard in Wharton County. A tornado moved northeast through Krasna, near
Wallis, killing five people. In El Campo, fruit fell off trees. Windmills and chimneys were blown down in Edna, while in Ganado and Louise, outhouses and barns were destroyed. In Houston, trees were uprooted and outhouses destroyed by the gale. Electric wires were downed. Trees were uprooted and damage to sorghum crops were reported in Lavaca County. The remnants of the storm produced heavy rainfall in Missouri and tornadoes in Indiana.

Hurricane Three 

The storm headed west-northwestward for a few days and slowly strengthened. Late on September 19, it accelerated and began curving northwestward. At 00:00 UTC the next day, the storm strengthened into a Category 1 hurricane on the modern-day Saffir–Simpson hurricane wind scale. Later on September 20, the hurricane curved northward and then to the northeast. Further deepening occurred, with the storm becoming a Category 2 hurricane early the following day.

On September 21, the system peaked with sustained winds of 100 mph (155 km/h). The storm began weakening on September 22 and fell to Category 1 intensity.

Hurricane Four 

A tropical depression developed in the Pacific Ocean while located about 105 mi (165 km) west-southwest of Tapachula, Chiapas, on October 3. The depression moved slowly north-northwestward and made landfall in a rural area of southeastern Oaxaca early the next day. On October 5, the system reached the Gulf of Mexico and soon intensified into a tropical storm. Thereafter, it curved east-northeastward and strengthened into a Category 1 hurricane by October 6.

However, on October 9, the hurricane weakened to a Category 1. Around 06:00 UTC the following day, the system weakened further to a tropical storm. The storm rapidly weakened inland and became extratropical early on October 11. The remnants accelerated while moving across the Southeastern United States and eventually emerged into the Atlantic Ocean, before dissipating south of Atlantic Canada on October 13. Some damage was reported in Tabasco due to gales. Along the eastern Gulf Coast of the United States, strong winds were observed.

Tropical Storm Five 

The final storm developed north of Puerto Rico at 00:00 UTC on November 1 as a tropical depression. Initially, it headed northwestward, but re-curved to the northeast about six hours later. By midday on November 1, the depression strengthened into a tropical storm. The storm continued to intensify and peaked with sustained winds of 70 mph (110 km/h) early on November 3. Later on November 5, the storm began heading in a more eastward direction and weakened.

Season effects

This is a table of all of the storms that have formed in the 1902 Atlantic hurricane season. It includes their duration, names, landfall(s)–denoted by bold location names – damages, and death totals. Deaths in parentheses are additional and indirect (an example of an indirect death would be a traffic accident), but were still related to that storm. Damage and deaths include totals while the storm was extratropical, a wave, or a low, and all of the damage figures are in 1902 USD.

See also 

 List of tropical cyclones
 Atlantic hurricane season
 1900–1940 South Pacific cyclone seasons
 1900–1950 South-West Indian Ocean cyclone seasons
 1900s Australian region cyclone seasons

References

External links 

 Monthly Weather Review

 
1902 natural disasters
1902 meteorology